Anthony Jermaine White (born December 17, 1984), known professionally as J. White Did It or simply J. White, is an American record producer, songwriter, and DJ from Leavenworth, Kansas. He is best known for producing Cardi B's chart-topping singles, "Bodak Yellow" (2017) and "I Like It" (2018). Additionally, J. White produced "Savage" by Megan Thee Stallion featuring Beyoncé, which also hit number-one on the Billboard Hot 100, as well as "A Lot" by 21 Savage featuring J. Cole, which reached number 12 on the Hot 100 and won the Grammy Award for Best Rap Song.

Early life
White was born on December 17, 1984, in Blytheville, Arkansas. He grew up in the cities of Kansas City and Leavenworth in Kansas. His father was a church singer and played guitar, his mother was also a church singer, his grandmother and uncle played drums. "At 15, I knew I couldn't play football. I was like, 'Oh, I'm not that good. I'm not that tall. I'm fast, but I'm not that fast. Really skinny,'" he said. He started making beats at the age of 16. At age 17, his uncle brought him his first keyboard, "Honestly, I thought when I got that keyboard that I was gonna be rich the next year. It's fixing to be a breeze. Literally, it wasn't." He graduated from Leavenworth High School.

Career
In 2005, White moved to New York City where he started learning how to produce records. There, he met Klenord "Shaft" Raphael, a producer who later went on to become his mentor and manager, who taught him how to sample songs. That summer, he moved back home to Kansas City, and, for the next ten years, worked as a janitor, a DJ, and a producer around the cities of Kansas, Dallas, Atlanta, and Los Angeles. During this period of time, he produced beats for several artists including Stevie Stone, Krizz Kaliko, Eric Bellinger, and Lyrica Anderson, but his music career wasn't taking off. He told The Kansas City Star that he wasn't getting credit on a lot of records he produced at the time.

In 2016, his manager Shaft invited him to his house in New York to ask him for beats. There, he met with Bronx rapper Cardi B, one of Shaft's other clients. "I began to work with her and I believed in what she believed in. We just all became one big happy family, and marched on to the promised land," he said. Their first collaboration was for 2016 promotional single "What a Girl Likes", followed by a number of songs from Cardi B's second mixtape, Gangsta Bitch Music, Vol. 2 (2017), including the Offset-assisted single "Lick".

In 2017, White produced Cardi B's major-label debut single "Bodak Yellow (Money Moves)". The song topped the US Billboard Hot 100 chart for three consecutive weeks, becoming the first song produced by him to achieve this spot. It also won Single of the Year at the 2017 BET Hip Hop Awards and Favorite Rap/Hip Hop Song at the 2018 American Music Awards. In September of that year, he signed a deal with rights management and publishing company Kobalt Music Group.

In 2018, he produced "I Like It", another single by Cardi B, Bad Bunny and J Balvin. The song also topped the Billboard Hot 100 chart, becoming his second number one. Billboard staff, Los Angeles Times, and Apple Music's editorial selection ranked it as the best song of the year. It was nominated for Record of the Year at the 61st Annual Grammy Awards.

White executive produced Iggy Azalea's second studio album In My Defense (2019), including its lead single "Sally Walker". The song peaked at number 62 on the Billboard Hot 100. He also produced the tracks "Started" and "Freak of the Weak".

J White is managed by Lucas Keller, Nic Warner and Chad Wes at Milk & Honey, and published by Sony Music Publishing for the world.

Grammy Awards

Personal life
White's mother was murdered on January 28, 2015, due to domestic violence, leading to what he recalls as "one of the lowest years of [his] life." He told The Kansas City Star that in 2016, "I was in a bad place. Everything felt like it was falling down on me. [...] My relationship with the mother of my kids was bad, I was broke. [...] The industry wasn't giving me any chances. I was just wanting to give up on everything: producing, life, all of that." He had attempted suicide twice that year. Most recently seen dating gospel singer Koryn Hawthorne.

Artistry
White claimed that he lets his beats and melodies come to him naturally: "I just let the spirit guide me, I just go with the flow, man. So if I feel like playing piano first or lighting some candles or doing jumping jacks, I do that. There can be no set rule for me making music". He believes hip hop records should come naturally and quickly: "I don't really believe in spending a lot of time [on hip hop records]," he told DJ Booth, adding, "If the energy is there and it hits you, it will hit you automatically. It doesn't take long to create great energy." He admitted that he created the beat for Cardi B's "Bodak Yellow" in 15 minutes only. Similar to Mike Will Made It, White makes it known with his full moniker "J. White Did It" that he's responsible for the beat. "I was like 'Oh, OK. My name is, like, everybody's name.' So I put the 'Did It' on to just be... If I didn't do it, I don't know who did." His producer tagline, "J. White, I need a beat, I can go off on (Ooh)," drops at the beginning of his songs.

Production discography

Charted songs

Production credits
Adapted from White's official SoundCloud page and Genius.com.

References

External links
 

1984 births
African-American businesspeople
African-American record producers
American hip hop record producers
Businesspeople from Kansas
Businesspeople from Texas
Grammy Award winners
Grammy Award winners for rap music
Living people
Musicians from Dallas
Musicians from Kansas City, Kansas
Southern hip hop musicians
21st-century African-American people
20th-century African-American people